Crowsonius is a genus of beetles in the family Monotomidae, containing the following species:

 Crowsonius meliponae Pakaluk & Slipinski, 1993
 Crowsonius parensis Pakaluk & Slipinski, 1995
 Crowsonius similis Pakaluk & Slipinski, 1993

References

Monotomidae
Cucujoidea genera